Marcin Skrzynecki is a Polish para table tennis player who competes at international table tennis competitions. He is a Paralympic and World champion and a double European champion in men's teams events. He has won his titles and medals with Piotr Grudzień.

References

Living people
Sportspeople from Warsaw
People from Zielona Góra
Paralympic table tennis players of Poland
Table tennis players at the 2004 Summer Paralympics
Table tennis players at the 2008 Summer Paralympics
Table tennis players at the 2012 Summer Paralympics
Table tennis players at the 2016 Summer Paralympics
Medalists at the 2012 Summer Paralympics
Medalists at the 2016 Summer Paralympics
Date of birth missing (living people)
Year of birth missing (living people)
Polish male table tennis players